Phyllodroma is a genus of beetles in the family Cicindelidae, containing the following species:

 Phyllodroma cylindricollis (Dejean, 1825)
 Phyllodroma hispidula (Bates, 1872)

References

Cicindelidae